Abdullahi Abdi Omar "Jawaan" (born 1949) is a Somaliland politician who introduced Somaliland national emblem in 1996. Omar also served as one of the first commissioners of the National Electoral Commission in Somaliland.

See also 

 National emblem of Somaliland

References

Ethnic Somali people
Living people
Somaliland politicians
1949 births